Graf Franz Wolff-Metternich (31 December 1893 – 25 May 1978) was a German aristocrat, art professor, historian and curator.

Biography
During World War II, he was responsible for the conservation of Rhineland and French art collections under the Kunstschutz principle, from 1940 to 1942. He was placed in contact with Jacques Jaujard, who as deputy head of the Louvre had secretly organized the evacuation of much of the Louvre art collection, which were sent into hiding to various locations across France. While Woff-Metternich had been appointed by Hitler to oversee France’s art collections, like many aristocrats he was not a Nazi member, and helped Jaujard preserve France’s art from Nazi looting.

However, in 1942, he was recalled from his post in Paris, France by the Nazis for thwarting their attempts to plunder French National art collections. He was awarded the Légion d'honneur in 1952 from President of France Charles de Gaulle at the suggestion of Jaujard.

References

1893 births
1978 deaths
Officiers of the Légion d'honneur
Knights Commander of the Order of Merit of the Federal Republic of Germany
Counts of Germany
Max Planck Institute directors